Thémistocle was a  74-gun ship of the line of the French Navy.

Career 
Built in Lorient, Thémistocle was transferred to the Mediterranean soon after her commissioning to reinforce the squadron under Admiral Truguet. Seized by the British at the surrendering of Toulon by a Royalist cabale, she was used as a prison hulk during the Siege of Toulon. At the fall of the city, Captain Sidney Smith had her scuttled by fire, along with Héros.

The wreck was refloated in 1804 to be broken up.

Notes, citations, and references
Notes

Citations

References

Ships of the line of the French Navy
Téméraire-class ships of the line
1791 ships
Maritime incidents in 1793